Investigative genetic genealogy, or forensic genetic genealogy, is the emerging practice of utilizing genetic information from direct-to-consumer companies for identifying suspects or victims in criminal cases. As of September 2021, the use of this practice has led to the discovery of over 150 suspects of murder and sexual assault. The investigative power of genetic genealogy revolves around the use of publicly accessible genealogy databases such as GEDMatch and FamilyTreeDNA. On GEDMatch, users are able to upload their genetic data from any direct-to-consumer company in an effort to identify relatives that have tested at companies other than their own.

Identifying unknown subjects through investigative genetic genealogy is done through the use of analysis of identity-by-descent (IBD) segments of DNA that indicate shared ancestors. Data available in GEDMatch, which is composed of genetic profiles from approximately 1.2 million individuals, has proven capable of identifying a third cousin or closer in over 90% of the population. This information, used in tandem with demographic identifiers like age, gender, and place of residence, is sufficient for identifying any person who has a third cousin or closer within a publicly accessible genetic genealogy database.

Law enforcement agencies have leveraged the access to public databases by uploading crime-scene genealogy data and inferring relatives to potential suspects. Family tree assembly and analysis of demographic identifiers is then carried out by genetic genealogy experts, either working directly for law enforcement agencies or through one of the many US companies that have been set up to work on these cases. Parabon Nanolabs is the most well known company working in this field. By January 2021 Parabon claimed to have used genetic genealogy to produce an investigative lead in over 200 cases. The DNA Doe Project, a non-profit organization, have also been instrumental in resolving unidentified remains cases, many of whom are victims of violent crimes.

Controversy 
The use of investigative genetic genealogy has been central in numerous high-profile cases, namely in the identification and ultimate arrest of Joseph DeAngelo, the Golden State Killer. Despite its apparent success, the growing use of genetic genealogy databases by law enforcement agencies has not avoided serious scrutiny. A year prior to the arrest of DeAngelo, an individual was wrongly identified as a suspect in the murder of Angie Dodge, an 18-year-old woman who was the victim of a 1996 murder in Idaho Falls, Idaho. Michael Usry was the subject of a police investigation that led to a court order requiring Ancestry.com to disclose the identity of a partial match to crime scene DNA. This partial match was Usry, who was ultimately cleared as a suspect after police secured a warrant for his DNA. This DNA test proved that he was not a full match to the perpetrator.

Privacy implications

Direct-to-consumer companies 
The use of genetic genealogy databases by investigators has initiated a debate over the Fourth Amendment implications of genealogy data. The Fourth Amendment states that a warrant is required in situations that violate an individual's reasonable expectations of privacy. Given the sensitivity of information within direct-to-consumer genealogy databases, particularly concerning medical traits, behavioral tendencies, ethnic background, and familial associations, courts have asserted that they are subject to protection under the Fourth Amendment.

Currently, direct-to-consumer companies do not promise complete protection of user data. 23andMe, a leading consumer genealogy company, states in its privacy policy that “23andMe will preserve and disclose any and all information to law enforcement agencies or others if required to do so by law or in the good faith belief that such preservation or disclosure is reasonably necessary to…comply with legal or regulatory process”.

In an effort to remain transparent to its consumers, 23andMe has a quarterly Transparency Report. This report identifies the number of government requests for user data in addition to the number of times data has been produced without the explicit consent of the individual(s) of interest. 23andMe claims to have never produced user data without consent. The other industry leader, Ancestry.com, takes an analogous stance on the privacy of user data and similarly provides an annual transparency report.

The direct-to-consumer genealogy company FamilyTreeDNA faced a backlash following an admission that they were working secretly with the FBI. This partnership was initiated in 2018 and had the goal of solving cold cases involving murder and rape. Following scrutiny, FamilyTreeDNA's president Bennett Greenspan apologized for a lack of transparency, stating “I am genuinely sorry for not having handled our communications with you as we should have”.

Public genetic genealogy databases 
Privacy implications pertaining to public databases like GEDMatch are distinct from direct-to-consumer companies. As users voluntarily upload their genealogy profiles to GEDMatch, they forfeit their privacy to the data. The third-party doctrine, originally established by the US Supreme Court, states that a person “has no legitimate expectation of privacy in information…voluntarily turn[ed] over to third parties”. However, following intense media attention after the arrest of the Golden State Killer, GEDMatch changed their terms of service to require individuals to opt into use of their profiles by third parties. In effect, privacy rights were shifted back into the hands of the users.

Potential for supplementing the FBI's CODIS System 
The US government's own Combined DNA Index System (CODIS) database is composed of forensic evidence assessible to local, state, and federal law enforcement officials. This database consists of genetic profiles of approximately 18 million different people, however these are limited to DNA samples from convicted felons and arrestees. Data on the racial distribution of profiles suggests that 8.6% of the entire African American population is present in the database compared to only 2% of the white population.

On the other hand, genetic profiles from direct-to-consumer databases and GEDMatch consist of 75% white individuals from Northern European descent. The vast overrepresentation of African American individuals within the CODIS database has rendered it relatively ineffective for solving serial murder and sexual assault cases, of which the majority of perpetrators are white. Based on data from 4,700 mass murderers, 57% of serial killers are white whereas only 29% are African American. It has been suggested that the use of investigative genetic genealogy, which relies heavily on databases like GEDMatch, would therefore help to reduce racial disparities in the current criminal justice system. However, in practice it has been found that the majority of victims identified through this technique were white.

References 

Genealogy
Forensic disciplines